Blatno may refer to the following places:
Czech Republic
 Blatno (Chomutov District)
 Blatno (Louny District)
Slovenia
 Blatno, Brežice, a settlement in the Municipality of Brežice